is located in the Hidaka Mountains, Hokkaidō, Japan.

References

Pirigai